John Michael Beale (16 October 1930 – September 1995) was an English professional football wing half who appeared in the Football League for Portsmouth.

Career statistics

References 

1930 births
1995 deaths
Footballers from Portsmouth
English footballers
Association football wing halves
English Football League players
Portsmouth F.C. players
Guildford City F.C. players
Southern Football League players